The knockout stage of the 2011–12 EHF Champions League was held from 14 March 2012 till 27 May 2012. The top four teams from the group stage advanced to the Round of last 16.

Seedings
The draw was held on 28 February 2012. Teams from pot 1 were drawn against teams from pot 4 and teams from pot 2 were drawn against teams from pot 3. Teams from pot 1 and 2 will play the second legs at home.

Last 16

The first legs were played on 14–18 March, and the second legs will be played on 18, 24 and 25 March 2012.

First leg

Second leg

Quarterfinals
The draw was held on 27 March 2012 at 11:30 local time in Vienna. The first legs were played on 18–22 April, and the second legs were played on 25–29 April 2012.

Seedings

First leg

Second leg

Final four
The semifinals and final were played in the Lanxess Arena at Cologne, Germany from May 26–27, 2012. The draw took place on May 2, 2012, in Cologne.

All times are UTC+2.

Semifinals

Third place game

Final

References

External links
EHF Site

2011–12 EHF Champions League